Michael Grant Day (born March 20, 1980) is an American actor, comedian, writer, producer, and game show host. He was hired as a writer for the NBC sketch comedy series Saturday Night Live before its 39th season in 2013. Day was then promoted to on-air cast status and became a featured player during the show's 42nd season in 2016, later being promoted to repertory status beginning with the show's 44th season in 2018. He is also the host of the Netflix show Is It Cake? Day previously was an on-air correspondent for The Tonight Show with Jay Leno and The Jay Leno Show.

Early life and education
Day was born March 20, 1980, in Orange, California. He attended Panorama Elementary School and later graduated from El Modena High School, the same high school as actor Milo Ventimiglia, in the city of Orange. There, he was involved in the drama program and the student government. He wrote comedic sketches for monthly assemblies and made the theme for his homecoming, "Batman". He also experienced extreme bullying, seeking refuge in theater. Day graduated from the University of California, Los Angeles with a degree in theater.

Career

Day began his career with the Groundlings, a Los Angeles-based improvisational theater group. With the Groundlings, Day and Michael Naughton wrote and co-starred in David Blaine Street Magic, a parody of magician David Blaine, portrayed by Mitch Silpa. The video, posted to YouTube, was once one of the most-viewed videos on the site.

Day was an original cast member on the improvisational comedy series Wild 'n Out on MTV. He played various characters in the Groundling stage show Groundlings, In The Study, With The Candlestick in early 2009 and directed Groundlings Space Camp. Day wrote for Showtime's The Underground in 2006.

Day starred in NBC's Kath & Kim remake (2009), wrote for and co-produced the Cartoon Network show Incredible Crew (2013), and wrote for Adult Swim's Robot Chicken in 2014. Day hosted a recurring segment parodying TMZ from 2010 to 2013 on The Jay Leno Show and The Tonight Show with Jay Leno. Day was a featured cast member of NBC variety show Maya & Marty, alongside Maya Rudolph, Martin Short, and Kenan Thompson. He also served as one of the show's co-head writers.

2013–present: Saturday Night Live

Day was hired as a writer for Saturday Night Live in 2013 for its 39th season. He was recommended for the job by Nasim Pedrad, who had worked with him before and was a cast member of SNL at the time, appearing in her fifth and final season on the show. On SNL he wrote many sketches featuring cast member & former Wild 'n Out co-star Taran Killam, with whom he wrote the screenplay to Brother Nature (2016).

He was promoted to featured player for season 42 and was promoted to a repertory player in the beginning of season 44. For his audition, he impersonated Donald Trump Jr. and SNL actor Kyle Mooney. His debut appearance was in season 42's first episode, October 1, 2016, hosted by Margot Robbie. Bobby Moynihan, Streeter Seidell, and Day wrote the sketch "Haunted Elevator" for the October 22, 2016 episode of SNL. Starring Tom Hanks as David S. Pumpkins, Day played one of two dancing skeletons in the sketch. The sketch went viral, and he reprised the role for The David S. Pumpkins Halloween Special (2017).

Celebrity impressions on Saturday Night Live

 Steve Bannon (dressed as the Grim Reaper)
 Travis Barker
 Richard Blumenthal
 Bruce Castor
 John Cornyn
 Steve Doocy
 Jack Dorsey
 Matt Duffer
 Joseph Dunford
Rob Dyrdek
Sean Evans
Colin Farrell
 Michael Flynn
 Merrick Garland
 Willie Geist
Matt Hall
Prince Harry
 Pee-Wee Herman
 Rian Johnson
 Tim Kaine
 Brian Kilmeade
 Steve King
 Greg Lee
 Adam Levine
 Howie Long
 Kevin Love
 Joe Manchin III
 Roy Moore
 Elon Musk
 John Oliver
 Mehmet Oz
 Pitbull
 Jamie Raskin
 Franklin D. Roosevelt
 Paul Ryan
 Bruce Schroeder
 Nate Silver
 Phil Simms
 Donald Trump Jr.
 Sam Worthington (as Jake Sully from the Avatar film series)

Recurring characters on Saturday Night Live
 Greg Duncan, one half of a couple whose forays into spicing up their sex life leave Greg seriously and comically injured by his shy, yet intimidating wife Shelley Duncan (Leslie Jones)
Mort Fellner, a supercentenarian who reports on the achievements and experiences of fellow supercentenarians; however, each report culminates in revealing that the achievement is due to the subject dying.
Nico Slobkin, one half a shallow couple always on the brink of an argument, who runs a relationship-themed Instagram account with his girlfriend Brie Bacardi (Heidi Gardner).
Matt Shatt, one half of a couple, who is so disproportionately unexceptional compared to his exceptionally attractive partner that others can't help but question how their relationship exists.
 Josh, one of the two unintelligent kids (the other being Lonnie, played by Cecily Strong) in the Science Room sketches.

Disney
Day and his writing partner Streeter Seidell have completed one project and have two projects in development for Disney. The first of these, Home Sweet Home Alone, the sixth film in the Home Alone franchise, was released on Disney+ on November 12, 2021. A live-action Inspector Gadget film is in pre-production.  Walt Disney Pictures is also planning to produce a remake of SpaceCamp.

Personal life
Day dated Selma Blair, whom he met on the set of Kath and Kim, from 2008 to 2010. 

Day is in a relationship with actress Paula Christensen. Their son was born in August 2012.

Filmography

Film

Television

References

External links 

 

1980 births
Living people
American male film actors
American male television actors
American male comedians
American sketch comedians
Male actors from Orange County, California
UCLA Film School alumni
American male voice actors
21st-century American male actors
Comedians from California
American impressionists (entertainers)
21st-century American comedians